The Shops at Columbus Circle is an upscale shopping mall in Deutsche Bank Center, a skyscraper complex in Manhattan, New York City.  It is located at Columbus Circle, next to the southwestern corner of Central Park.

Details
The shopping mall includes Amazon Books, H&M, L'Occitane, Michael Kors, Hugo Boss, Tumi, Coach, Cole Haan, Thomas Pink, J.Crew and Stuart Weitzman. The mall also has several restaurants such as the Michelin 3-star Per Se, Masa, the East Coast flagship of Williams Sonoma, and a Whole Foods Market. It is owned by The Related Companies.

When opened, the Whole Foods Market at Columbus Circle sold liquor from an attached room near the cash registers away from the main shopping aisles. However, this configuration was in violation of New York's liquor licensing laws, which require grocery stores to have a separate street entrance to their liquor departments, ostensibly to avoid minors from buying liquors. In 2005, Whole Foods settled with state authorities and closed its liquor operations at Columbus Circle, hoping to transfer its license to a new location it would be opening on the Lower East Side. The space formerly used for liquor now sells Whole Foods' ECO line of cotton/hemp clothing, Whole Foods' health line Whole Body, and a restaurant, On Tap.

References

External links
Homepage for The Shops at Columbus Circle

Shopping malls in New York City
Columbus Circle
Shopping malls established in 2003
2003 establishments in New York City
Commercial buildings in Manhattan